Kürkçüler is a quarter of the city Bolu, Bolu District, Bolu Province, Turkey. Its population is 2,470 (2021).

References

Populated places in Bolu District